The Best of Roxy Music is a greatest hits album by English art rock band Roxy Music, released in 2001. At least one song from all eight of the band's studio albums is represented, as well as some non-album singles. The songs are arranged in reverse chronological order.

Track listing

Personnel 

 Bryan Ferry – vocals, keyboards (1971–1983)
 Andy Mackay – saxophone, oboe (1971–1983)
 Phil Manzanera – lead guitar (1972–1983)
 Paul Thompson – drums (1971–1980)
 Brian Eno – synthesizer, treatments, backing vocals  (1970–1973)
 Graham Simpson – bass  (1971–1972) 
 Eddie Jobson – keyboards, synthesizers, electric violin  (1973–1976) 

Production 
 Design – Bogdan Zarkowski, Bryan Ferry, Nick De Ville
 Liner Notes – Dr.I.D.Smith 
 Photography By – Anton Corbijn, Antony Price, Karl Stoecker
 Producer – Chris Thomas, John Punter, Peter Sinfield, Rhett Davies, Roxy Music

Charts

Certifications

References

External links 
 Roxy Music - The Best Of Roxy Music at Discogs

Roxy Music compilation albums
Virgin Records compilation albums
2001 greatest hits albums